is a passenger railway station located in Sakae-ku, Yokohama, Kanagawa Prefecture, Japan, operated by the East Japan Railway Company (JR East).

Lines

Station layout 
The station consists of one island platform serving two tracks. The platform is connected to the station building by an underpass. The station has a "Midori no Madoguchi" staffed ticket office.

Platforms

History
Hongōdai Station opened on 9 April 1973. With the privatization of JNR on 1 April 1987, the station came under the control of JR East.

Passenger statistics
In fiscal 2019, the station was used by an average of 18,564 passengers daily (boarding passengers only).

The passenger figures (boarding passengers only) for previous years are as shown below.

Surrounding area
 Sakae Ward Office
 Sakae Library
 Yokohama Sakae Mutual Aid Hospital
 Kanagawa Prefectural Hakuyo High School
 Hongodai Ekimae housing complex

See also
 List of railway stations in Japan

References

External links

 

Railway stations in Kanagawa Prefecture
Railway stations in Japan opened in 1973
Keihin-Tōhoku Line
Negishi Line
Railway stations in Yokohama